Anhaltisches Theater Dessau is a theatre in Dessau, Saxony-Anhalt, Germany, which was called Landestheater Dessau until 1984. It is  offering drama, musical theatre (operas, operettas, musicals), ballets, concerts of the  orchestra, and puppetry.

Today, the theatre has a capacity of around 1100 spectators and is equipped with one of the largest revolving stages in Germany.

History 
Theatre life in Dessau has a long tradition. As early as 1794, there was a permanent theatre ensemble in Dessau. The first venue was the Fürstliche Reitbahn, and the first theatre director was Friedrich Wilhelm Bossann. The Anhalt Philharmonic Orchestra was also founded at this time.

By 1798, Friedrich Wilhelm von Erdmannsdorff (Wörlitz Park) erected the first theatre building. As Leopold III, Duke of Anhalt-Dessau had the theatre closed in 1810 for financial reasons as a result of the events of the war, the amateur project  once again gained importance for a short time.

After two fires in 1855 (rebuilt) and 1922, the Fürstliche Reitbahn was once again the venue.

After three years of construction, the present building was completed in 1938 as the largest stage north of the Alps at the time, with 1250 seats. The architects were Friedrich Lipp and Werry Roth. The opening with Weber's Der Freischütz took place in the presence of Adolf Hitler and Joseph Goebbels on 29 May 1938.

After the almost complete destruction during one of the heavy  on 30 May 1944, the theatre was reopened in 1949 after reconstruction with Mozart's The Magic Flute under the directorship of Willy Bodenstein (artistic director from 1949 to 1968). In 1945, the remaining theatre staff found a provisional rehearsal and performance space, and rehearsals began again in November 1945. In December, the first performance of Beethoven's Fidelio took place. Willy Bodenstein followed as artistic director and general director:
 1968–1973: Karl Schneider
 1973–1983: Herbert Keller
 1983–1992: Peter Gogler
 1992–2009: Johannes Felsenstein
 2009–2015: André Bücker

In 1994, the theatre, which until then had been called "Landestheater Dessau", was renamed "Anhaltisches Theater". 

Due to massive cuts in the state subsidy by the state government of Saxony-Anhalt in 2013, the theatre saw its continued existence as endangered. Even by closing three sections, the savings targets could not be met. General director Bücker was a harsh critic of the cuts. His contract was not extended beyond the 2014/2015 season by the city of Dessau.

Johannes Weigand has been the general director of the Anhaltisches Theater since the 2015/2016 season. Weigand was the opera director of the Wuppertaler Bühnen until 2014.

Awards 
In 1954, the theatre received the Vaterländischer Verdienstorden in silver.

Further reading 
 Hartmut Runge: Dessauer Theaterbilder. Zur 200-jährigen Geschichte des Theaters in Dessau. Anhaltische Verlagsgesellschaft, Dessau 1994, .
 Karl-Heinz Köhler, Lutz Buchmann, Ronald Müller: Von der Fürstlichen Hofkapelle zur Anhaltische Philharmonie — 250 Jahre Orchester in Dessau, edited by the Anhaltischen Theater Dessau, Jonitzer Verlag, Dessau 2016,

References

External links 

 
 

Theatres in Germany
History of Anhalt
Culture of Saxony-Anhalt
Dessau
1930s architecture
Nazi architecture
Recipients of the Patriotic Order of Merit in silver